The 1975 World Cup took place 4–7 December at the Navatananee Course in Khan Na Yao district, 20 kilometres northeast of Bangkok city center in Thailand. It was the 23rd World Cup event. The tournament was a 72-hole stroke play team event with 47 teams of which 45 teams completed the competition. Each team consisted of two players from a country. The combined score of each team determined the team results. The United States team of Lou Graham and Johnny Miller won by ten strokes over the Taiwan team of Hsieh Min-Nan and Kuo Chie-Hsiung. It was the 13th win for United States in the 23 times the World Cup, formerly named Canada Cup, had been contested. The individual competition for The International Trophy, was won by Miller, two strokes ahead of three players, who shared second place.

Teams 

(a) denotes amateur

Source:

Scores 
Team

International Trophy

Sources:

References

|display=inline,title}}

World Cup (men's golf)
Golf tournaments in Thailand
Sport in Bangkok
World Cup golf
World Cup golf